Graeme Frislie (born 2 February 2001) is an Australian road and track cyclist, who currently rides for UCI Continental team . He won a bronze medal in the team pursuit at the 2022 Commonwealth Games.

Major results

Track

2019
 National Junior Championships
1st  Team pursuit
1st  Scratch
1st  Madison
1st  Kilometer
 2nd  Omnium, UCI Junior World Championships
2020
 National Championships
2nd Scratch
3rd Kilometer
2021
 National Championships
1st  Team pursuit
1st  Scratch
1st  Elimination race
2022
 Oceanian Championships
1st  Elimination race
1st  Team pursuit
3rd  Omnium
 National Championships
1st  Team pursuit
1st  Omnium
1st  Elimination race
2nd Scratch
 1st Team pursuit – Milton, UCI Nations Cup
 3rd  Team pursuit, Commonwealth Games

Road
2019
 2nd Criterium, National Junior Road Championships
2022
 1st  Criterium, National Under-23 Road Championships
 1st Stage 2 Tour of Tasmania
2023
 1st  Criterium, National Under-23 Road Championships
 2nd Overall Bay Crits
1st Stage 2

References

External links
 

2001 births
Living people
Australian male cyclists
Australian track cyclists
21st-century Australian people
Cyclists at the 2022 Commonwealth Games
Commonwealth Games bronze medallists for Australia
Commonwealth Games medallists in cycling
Medallists at the 2022 Commonwealth Games
People from Kalispell, Montana